Frederick Hervey may refer to:

Frederick Hervey, 4th Earl of Bristol (1730–1803)
Frederick Hervey, 1st Marquess of Bristol (1769–1859)
Frederick Hervey, 2nd Marquess of Bristol (1800–1864)
Frederick Hervey, 3rd Marquess of Bristol (1834–1907)
Frederick Hervey, 4th Marquess of Bristol (1863–1951)
John Hervey, 7th Marquess of Bristol (Frederick William John Augustus Hervey, 1954–1999)
Frederick Hervey, 8th Marquess of Bristol (born 1979)

See also
Fred Harvey (disambiguation)